The 2014 WNBA season is the 15th season for the Indiana Fever of the Women's National Basketball Association.

Transactions

WNBA Draft
The following are the Fever's selections in the 2014 WNBA Draft. Natasha Howard (5th) Natalie Achonwa(9th)

Trades

Personnel changes

Additions

Subtractions

Roster

Depth

Season standings

Statistics

Regular season

Awards and honors
Tamika Catchings (all star)9th appearance  Briann January (all star) 1st Appearance

References
https://www.basketball-reference.com/wnba/teams/IND/2014.html

https://www.espn.com/wnba/standings/_/season/2014/group/conference

https://sports.yahoo.com/wnba/teams/indiana/roster/

https://bleacherreport.com/articles/2029403-wnba-draft-2014-results-complete-round-by-round-results-and-analysis

https://www.cbssports.com/wnba/news/wnba-trade-grades-fever-trade-teaira-mccowan-to-wings-in-deal-involving-five-first-round-draft-picks/

External links

Indiana Fever seasons
Indiana
Indiana Fever